Tomáš Vorel (born 2 June 1957) is a Czech film director, screenwriter and actor.

Selected filmography

External links
 

1957 births
Living people
Film directors from Prague
Czech male film actors
Male actors from Prague